The New Zealand Masters is a darts tournament that has been held annually since 1978.

List of winners

Men's

Women's

References

External links
New Zealand Darts Council

Darts tournaments
Sports competitions in New Zealand
1978 establishments in New Zealand
Recurring sporting events established in 1978